The Nazi Plan is a 1945 documentary film, compiled from extensive footage of captured Nazi propaganda and newsreel image and sound recordings. It was produced and presented as evidence at the Nuremberg Trials for Hermann Göring and twenty other Nazi leaders.

Background
The Nazi Plan was shown as evidence at the International Military Tribunal (IMT) in Nuremberg on December 11, 1945. It was compiled by Budd Schulberg and other military personnel, under the supervision of Navy Commander James B. Donovan. The compilers took pains to use only German source material, including official newsreels and other German films (1919–45). It was put together for the US Counsel for the Prosecution of Axis Criminality and the US Office of the Chief Counsel for War Crimes."

"In the course of this work, Budd Schulberg apprehended Leni Riefenstahl at her country home in Kitzbühl, Austria, as a material witness, and took her to the Nuremberg editing room, so she could help Budd identify Nazi figures in her films and in other German film material his unit had captured. Stuart Schulberg [also] took possession of the photo archive of Heinrich Hoffmann, Hitler’s personal photographer, and became the film unit’s expert on still photo evidence. Most of the stills presented at the trial carry his affidavit of authenticity."

Film content 
The film is divided into four parts:

 The rise of the NSDAP, 1921 to 1933
 Acquiring totalitarian control of Germany, 1933 to 1935
 Preparation for wars of Aggression, 1935 to 1939
 Wars of Aggression, 1939 to 1944

Media 
The effect and context of the film, specifically Goering's presence within the Nuremberg Trials, was discussed in episode 1, entitled "On the Desperate Edge of Now", of the 1995 BBC series The Living Dead written and directed by Adam Curtis.

References

External links 

1945 films
American documentary films
Documentary films about World War II
Documentary films about the Holocaust
Nuremberg trials
American black-and-white films
1945 documentary films
1940s English-language films
1940s American films